Out of the Valley is a 1994 album by contemporary folk singer-songwriter John Gorka.  This is Gorka's fifth album and unlike the previous four recorded in various places in the northeastern United States, Out of the Valley was recorded at Imagine Sound Studios in Nashville, Tennessee.  This is also the first of several Gorka albums to employ the talents of guitarist/producer John Jennings.

Guest vocalists include country music superstars Kathy Mattea and Mary Chapin Carpenter among others.  Guest instrumentalists include guitarist Leo Kottke, Fairport Convention drummer Dave Mattacks, and bluegrass virtuosos Jerry Douglas and Tim O'Brien.  A notable absence is the voice of Lucy Kaplansky whose background vocals have been a feature of all other Gorka albums.

This is perhaps Gorka's most commercial album and is his only work to have ranked on one of Billboard's charts.  It peaked at # 26 on the "Heatseekers" chart.  Reactions to the increased level of commercial production in Gorka's folk music were varied.  Allmusic states: "...many of the dense musical
arrangements do a disservice to his powerful voice."  Meanwhile a review in Sing Out! reads: "...nowhere does star power take precedence over bringing out the best in these songs.  Congratulations are due to both Gorka and to producer John Jennings."  The songs are more upbeat than some of Gorka's earlier works and generally better suited to a more glossy production.  Gorka's writing, however, remains strong.  Sing Out! states that "Out of the Valley... reveals a mature artist with a keen sense of observation with equal parts humor and compassion."  "The Valley" in Gorka's title is a reference to Pennsylvania's Lehigh Valley and as with Gorka's previous albums a number of songs feature stories and characters that are based on Gorka's experiences living in this area that surrounds Bethlehem, Pennsylvania.

High Street Records also offered a limited release promotional EP titled Motor Folkin with alternative mixes of songs from the Out of the Valley recording sessions.

Track listing
All songs written by John Gorka except where noted.
 "Good Noise" – 3:05    
 "That's Why" – 3:19    
 "Carnival Knowledge (Second Hand Face)" – 3:46    
 "Talk About Love" – 3:11    
 "Big Time Lonesome" – 5:31    
 "Furniture" – 4:47     
 "Mystery to Me" (Gorka, Bartley) – 3:43     
 "Out of the Valley" – 4:48     
 "Thoughtless Behavior" – 4:22     
 "Always Going Home" – 3:32     
 "Flying Red Horse" – 4:14     
 "Up Until Then" – 4:48

Songs

Good Noise
"Good Noise" is an upbeat gospel-tinged song that promotes a bright optimism not often found in Gorka's earlier work.  High Street Records promoted this song with a music video that appeared on media such as CMT.  Cover versions include a recording of the song by the Scottish folk band, The John Wright Band for the 2001 album, Language of the Heart.

Musicians:
 Drums – Dave Mattacks
 Bass – J. T. Brown
 Piano – Matt Rollings
 Electric and acoustic guitar – John Jennings
 Acoustic guitar and vocal – John Gorka
 Backing Vocals – Jonell Mosser, Barbara Santoro, Vinnie Santoro, and John Jennings
 "Testifying vocals" – Jonell Mosser

That's Why
Gorka never explicitly names the subject of "That's Why".  Listeners, however, are able to ascertain much from various references.  The following lines about a commemorative stamp are just one example:

"That's Why" is not Gorka's only tribute to the "King of Rock'n'Roll", for another see the 2006 Billy C. Wirtz album, Sermon from Bethlehem, for a recording of "The King & I", a tune penned by Gorka and Fred Koller.

Musicians:
 Bass – – Michael Manring
 Lead guitar – Leo Kottke
 Acoustic guitar & vocal – John Gorka
 Backing vocal – Kathy Mattea

Carnival Knowledge
According to Sing Out! "Carnival Knowledge" is a tragic story of a circus clown whose grease paint provides his only escape from the depths of low self-esteem."

Musicians:
 Drums – Vinnie Santoro
 Bass – J. T. Brown
 Electric guitar – John Jennings
 Acoustic guitar – John Gorka

Talk About Love
"Talk About Love" is another one of Gorka's happy blue-inflected love songs.  As with the track, "Good Noise" the liner notes describe Jonell Mossers' work as "Testifying vocals".

Musicians:
 Drums – Dave Mattacks
 Bass – J. T. Brown
 Piano & Organ – Matt Rollings
 Electric, acoustic guitars & backing vocal – John Jennings
 12-string guitar & vocal – John Gorka
 Testifying & backing vocals – Jonell Mosser

Big Time Lonesome

 Bass – John Jennings
 "Weisenheimer" guitar – Jerry Douglas
 Acoustic guitar – John Gorka

Furniture
Sing Out! called "Furniture", a "song of critical self-examination without self-pity."

Musicians:
 10-string basses – Michael Manring
 Guitar – Leo Kottke
 Vocal – John Gorka
 Backing vocals – Kathy Mattea

Mystery to Me
According to Allmusic, "the track "Mystery to Me" reveals [Gorka's] wicked sense of humor about the mysteries of attraction."

Musicians:
 Drums – Dave Mattacks
 Bass – J. T. Brown
 Electric & acoustic guitars – John Jennings
 Gibson archtop acoustic guitar & vocal – John Gorka
 Backing & testifying vocals – Jonell Mosser
 Tambourine – "Mystery Man"

Out of the Valley
Like many songs in Gorka's earlier catalog, "Out of the Valley" draws on Gorka's experiences living in Pennsylvania's Lehigh Valley.  It was sometime around the time of the recording of this album that Gorka himself moved out of "The Valley" and began the transition to his current home in Minnesota.

Musicians:
 Drums – Dave Mattacks
 Bass – J. T. Brown
 Electric guitar & organ – John Jennings
 Acoustic guitar & vocal – John Gorka
 Additional vocals – Mary Chapin Carpenter

Thoughtless Behavior

Musicians
 Acoustic guitar & vocal – John Gorka
 Backpack guitar, & harmony vocal – John Jennings
 Bass – – Michael Manring

Always Going Home

Musicians:
 Percussion – Vinnie Santoro
 Bass mandolin & vocal – Tim O'Brien
 Bass – John Jennings
 Dobro – Jerry Douglas
 12-string guitear – John Gorka

Flying Red Horse
"Flying Red Horse" has been described as a "fantasy of freedom inspired by a gas station sign." Gorka shares his vision of the Mobil logo coming to life and escaping to the sky.  While the song is delivered in a serious tone Gorka manages to inject a fair amount of humor:

A reviewer for Allmusic preferred the relatively simple production.  He wrote that this track, "in which the only instrumentation is a guitar and the voices of Gorka and Mary Chapin Carpenter, demonstrates an amazing imagination and an ability to captivate with great storytelling."

Musicians:
 Bass – Edgar Meyer
 Piano Matt Rollings
 Acoustic guitar & vocal John Gorka
 Backing vocal Mary Chapin Carpenter

Up Until Then
Sing Out! stated that "Up Until Then" offers a scene of local characters "that would make Tom Waits proud."

Musicians:
 Drums – Dave Mattacks
 Bass – J. T. Brown
 Electric & acoustic guitars – John Jennings
 Acoustic guitars & vocal – John Gorka
 Harmony vocal – Jonell Mosser

Credits 
Musicians:
 (see individual songs above)

Production:
 Producer – John Jennings
 Recorded – Eric Paul at Imagine Sound Studios, Nashville, Tennessee, US
 Additional recording of Leo Kottke – Scott Rivard at Studio M, Saint Paul, Minnesota, US
 Mixed – Bob Dawson and John Jennings at Bias Recording Company, Springfield, Virginia, US

[[Image:Gorka MotorFolkin.jpg|right|thumb|Cover of Motor Folkin, a 1994 promotional EP]]

 Motor Folkin' Motor Folkin'''' was a 1994 limited issue promotional EP released by High Street Records.  Perhaps the track of greatest interest from this release was the live solo version of "Furniture" recorded at "The Mountain", KMTT in Seattle, Washington. Remixes of "Mystery to Me" and "Good Noise" were also included, as was an in-studio recording of "Campaign Trail". A final mix of "Campaign Trail" was not released until 1996 on Gorka's Between Five and Seven''.

External links 
 Out of the Valley page at the Official John Gorka web site (lyrics, audio samples)

Notes and sources 

John Gorka albums
1994 albums
Windham Hill Records albums